Susy Andersen (born Maria Antonietta Golgi; 20 April 1940 in Pola) is an Italian actress.

Filmography

External links 
 

Italian actresses
1940 births
Living people
People from Pula